To Have & to Hold is a 1996 Australian thriller film directed by John Hillcoat and starring Tchéky Karyo, Rachel Griffiths and Steve Jacobs. It won an award at the 1997 ARIA Music Awards

The film was shot on location in New Guinea and Far North Queensland.

Cast
Tchéky Karyo as Jack 
Rachel Griffiths as Kate
Steve Jacobs as Sal
Anni Finsterer as Rose
David Field as Stevie

Soundtrack
The soundtrack to the film was composed by Blixa Bargeld, Nick Cave, and Mick Harvey. At the ARIA Music Awards of 1997 the album won Best Original Soundtrack, Cast or Show Album.

 "To Have and to Hold" - 3:04
 "The Jungle of Love" - 2:28
 "Candlelit Bedroom"  - 0:59
 "Luther" - 0:55
 "A House in the Jungle" - 1:14
 "Delirium" -  0:45
 "The River At Night"  - 1:56
 "Mourning Song"  - 2:48
 "Romantic Theme" - 3:41
 "Snow Vision" - 1:26
 "Rose" - 1:38
 "The Clouds" - 0:48
 "Noah's Funeral" - 0:54
 "The Flight" - 1:43
 "Kate Leaves" - 1:11
 "We're Coming-The Riot" - 1:21
 "Murder" - 1:16
 "The Red Dress" - 1:26
 "I Threw It All Away" - 2:14
 "To Have and to Hold-End Titles" - 3:49
 "Gangster Bone" - 3:55

References

External links

To Have & To Hold at Oz Movies

1996 films
1996 thriller films
Australian thriller films
ARIA Award-winning albums
Films directed by John Hillcoat
Films scored by Nick Cave
Films set in Melbourne
Films set in Papua New Guinea
Films shot in Queensland
1990s English-language films